Dharamyudh is a 1988 Indian Bollywood action drama film directed by Sudarshan Nag. It stars Sunil Dutt, Shatrughan Sinha, Kimi Katkar in pivotal roles.

Plot
Pratap and Vikram Singh are two friends. Pratap's sister, Guddi was raped and murdered. Pratap is now ready to take revenge.

Cast
Sunil Dutt as Thakur Vikram Singh
Shatrughan Sinha as Pratap Singh
Kimi Katkar as Suman
Aditya Pancholi as Thakur Vijay Singh "Chhotu"
Ranjeet as Jaggu 
Pran as Thakur Zorawar Singh "Bade Thakur"
Suresh Oberoi as Kundan 
Sushma Seth as Kundan's Mother

Soundtrack

References

External links
 

1980s Hindi-language films
1988 films
Films scored by Rajesh Roshan
Indian action drama films